Events from the year 1286 in Ireland.

Incumbent
Lord: Edward I

Births

Deaths
 10 November – Maurice FitzGerald, 3rd Lord of Offaly
 Cathal Ó Madadhan,  King of Síol Anmchadha